A supreme court is the highest court within the hierarchy of courts in most legal jurisdictions. Supreme courts include:

List of supreme courts

States recognised by the United Nations

States recognised by at least one United Nations member

States not recognised by any United Nations members

Sui generis entities

International courts

There are a number of international courts that are the highest courts of appeal for members of the Organisation of Eastern Caribbean States (OECS) and some of the countries of the Commonwealth of Nations respectively. However, the members of those organisations do sometimes have high courts of their own and their jurisdiction may be limited.

See also 
 List of national governments
 List of national leaders
 List of national legislatures
 Lists of supreme court justices

References

 This court is not independent of either the legislature and/or executive of that country.

Law-related lists